Stroszek is a 1977 German tragicomedy film directed by Werner Herzog and starring Bruno S., Eva Mattes, and Clemens Scheitz. Written specifically for Bruno S., the film was shot in Plainfield, Wisconsin, and North Carolina. Most of the lead roles are played by non-actors.

Plot
Bruno Stroszek (Bruno S.) is a Berlin street performer. Released from prison and warned to stop drinking, he immediately goes to a familiar bar where he meets Eva (Eva Mattes), a prostitute down on her luck, and lets her stay with him at the apartment his landlord kept for him. They are then harried and beaten by Eva's former pimps, who insult Bruno, pull his accordion apart and humiliate him by making him kneel on his grand piano with bells balanced on his back. Faced with the prospect of further harassment, Bruno and Eva decide to leave Germany and accompany Bruno's eccentric elderly neighbour Scheitz (Clemens Scheitz), who was planning to move to Wisconsin to live with his American nephew Clayton.

After sightseeing in New York City they buy a used car and arrive in a winter-bound, barren prairie near the fictional town of 'Railroad Flats'. There Bruno works as a mechanic with Clayton and his assistant (played by Ely Rodriguez). Eva works as a waitress at a truck stop and Scheitz pursues his interest in animal magnetism. Eva and Bruno buy a mobile-home which is sited on Clayton's land; with bills mounting, the bank threatens to repossess it. Eva returns to prostitution to supplement her wages, but it is not enough to meet the payments. She tires of Bruno's worrying and leaves him, accepting a ride with truck drivers bound for Vancouver.

A man from the bank (Scott McKain) visits Bruno, who is now drinking steadily, and has him sign off on the repossession.  The home is auctioned, and he and Scheitz, who is convinced that the world is conspiring against him, set off to confront the "conspiracy." Finding the bank they wish to rob closed, they hold up a barber shop beneath it, make off with 32 dollars and then go shopping in a small store across the street. The police arrive and arrest Scheitz for armed robbery without noticing Bruno.

Holding a large frozen turkey from the store and the shotgun, Bruno returns to the garage where he works, loads the tow truck with beer, and drives along a highway into the mountains.

Upon entering the small town of Cherokee, North Carolina, the truck breaks down and Bruno pulls over to a restaurant, where he tells his story to a German-speaking businessman. He then starts the truck, and leaves it circling in the parking lot with a fire taking hold in the engine compartment. Bruno then goes into a roadside amusement park across the street, where he starts a ski-lift and rides on it with his frozen turkey. After Bruno disappears from view a single shot rings out. The police arrive at the scene to find the truck is now fully ablaze. The film ends with a sequence showing a chicken dancing, a duck playing a drum and a rabbit riding a toy fire truck, in coin-operated attractions that Bruno activated on his way to the ski-lift.

Production
Stroszek was conceived during the production of Woyzeck, for which Herzog had originally planned to use Bruno Schleinstein in the title role. After believing Klaus Kinski to be more suitable for the part, Herzog specifically wrote the leading role in Stroszek to compensate Schleinstein for his disappointment over Woyzeck. The film was written in four days and uses a number of biographical details from Schleinstein's life.

Parts of the movie were shot in Nekoosa, Wisconsin and in a truck stop in Madison, Wisconsin. Other parts of the film were shot in Plainfield, Wisconsin. Herzog had planned to meet documentary filmmaker Errol Morris in Plainfield to dig up the grave of infamous killer and body snatcher Ed Gein's mother, but Morris never showed. The concluding scenes were shot in Cherokee, North Carolina.

Reception
Film review aggregator Rotten Tomatoes reports a 95% approval critic response based on 19 reviews, indicating "Fresh" and an average score of 8.2/10. Vincent Canby of The New York Times gave the film a positive review, stating, "It's a 'road' picture. In some distant way it reminds me of Easy Rider, but it's an Easy Rider without sentimentality or political paranoia. It's terrifically, spontaneously funny and, just as spontaneously, full of unexpected pathos." Gene Siskel of the Chicago Tribune awarded his top score of four stars and placed it at #10 on his year-end list of the best movies he saw in 1978, calling it a "strange, funny, heartbreaking film." Variety called it "a moody, overlong pic ... which seems to fizzle out and climax at least three times before the actual finale." Charles Champlin of the Los Angeles Times declared it "a strange and original piece of work ... if in its last third it is overwhelmed by its own symbolisms and is disappointing, it has in its first half some passages of terrific power and brutal believability." Penelope Gilliatt of The New Yorker wrote, "This is a brilliant, poetic film about a man's clutch on a difficult existence." A less enthusiastic review by Gary Arnold of The Washington Post called it a "dogged, obstinately despairing parable" that "is strewn with gauche little appeals for sympathy." Richard Combs of The Monthly Film Bulletin was also somewhat negative and stated, "On such well-trodden ground, it seems, Herzog has little to say that is not derivative of himself or others; one can only hope that he quickly finds his way back to more unfamiliar regions."

Geoff Andrew of Time Out said, "Although relatively indulgent for Herzog, the film's comedy works well enough, because Herzog's idiosyncratic imagination finds an ideal counterpoint in the bleak flatlands of poor white America. His view of that country is the most askance since the films of Monte Hellman. For all the supposed lightness, it is the film's core of despair which in the end devours everything."

In 2002, Roger Ebert of the Chicago Sun-Times called it "one of the oddest films ever made" when including it as one of his "Great Movies".

In popular culture
 One of the last things Ian Curtis of the band Joy Division did, just prior to dying by suicide in 1980, was watch the film, as well as listen to Iggy Pop's The Idiot. The ending scenes of Stroszek appear in the 2002 film 24 Hour Party People and the 2007 film Control, during scenes which portray Curtis' final moments.
 An audio clip of dialogue from Stroszek is used at the end of "Bilar" as it leads into the beginning of "Drugs" on the 2010 album LP4 by Ratatat.
 In Noah Baumbach's film The Meyerowitz Stories, Harold Meyerowitz and Maureen's dog Bruno is said to have been named after this movie's protagonist.

References

External links

1977 films
1970s avant-garde and experimental films
German avant-garde and experimental films
West German films
1970s German-language films
English-language German films
Films directed by Werner Herzog
Films set in Berlin
Films set in West Germany
Films set in Wisconsin
Films shot in Wisconsin
Films shot in North Carolina
Films shot in New York City
Films shot in Germany
1970s German films
Foreign films set in the United States